Azure is the color between cyan and blue on the spectrum of visible light. It is often described as the color of the sky on a clear day.

On the RGB color wheel, "azure" (hexadecimal #0080FF) is defined as the color at 210 degrees, i.e., the hue halfway between blue and cyan. In the RGB color model, used to create all the colors on a television or computer screen, azure is created by adding a 50% of green light to a 100% of blue light. 

In the X11 color system, which became a model for early web colors, azure is depicted as a pale cyan or white cyan.

Etymology and history

The name of the stone came to be associated with its color.

The word was adopted into English from the French, and the first recorded use of it as a color name in English was in 1374 in Geoffrey Chaucer's work Troilus and Criseyde, where he refers to "a broche, gold and asure" (a brooch, gold and azure).

Some languages, such as Italian, generally consider azure to be a basic colour, separate and distinct from blue. Some sources even go to the point of defining blue as a darker shade of azure.

Azure also describes the color of the mineral azurite, both in its natural form and as a pigment in various paint formulations. In order to preserve its deep color, azurite was ground coarsely. Fine-ground azurite produces a lighter, washed-out color. Traditionally, the pigment was considered unstable in oil paints, and was sometimes isolated from other colors and not mixed. 

The use of the term spread through the practice of heraldry, where "azure" represents a blue color in the system of tinctures. In engravings, it is represented as a region of parallel horizontal lines, or by the abbreviation az. or b. In practice, azure has been represented by any number of shades of blue. In later heraldic practice a lighter blue, called bleu celeste ("sky blue"), is sometimes specified.

Distinction among indigo, azure, and cyan

According to the logic of the RGB color wheel, indigo colors are those colors with hue codes between 255 and 225 (degrees), azure colors are those colors with hue codes between 195 and 225, and cyan colors are those colors with hue codes between 165 and 195. Another way of describing it could be that cyan is a mixture of blue and green light, azure is a mixture of blue and cyan light, and indigo is a mixture of blue and violet light.

All of the colors shown below in the section shades of azure are referenced as having a hue between 195 and 225 degrees, with the exception of the very pale X11 web color azure – RGB (240, 255, 255) – which, with a hue of 180 degrees, is a tone of cyan, but follows the artistic meaning of azure as sky blue.

In nature
Insects
 Azure bluet (Enallagma aspersum), damselfly found in North America
 Azure damselfly (Coenagrion puella), damselfly found in Europe
 Azure hawker (Aeshna caerulea), dragonfly in the family Aeshnidae

Birds
 Azure gallinule (Porphyrio flavirostris), bird in the rail family, Rallidae
  Azure jay (Cyanocorax caeruleus) bird in the crow family, Corvidae
 Azure kingfisher (Alcedo azurea), bird in the river kingfisher family, Alcedinidae
  Azure tit (Cyanistes cyanus), bird in the tit family, Paridae
 Azure-crowned hummingbird (Amazilia cyanocephala), a hummingbird in the family Trochilidae
 Azure-hooded jay (Cyanolyca cucullata), bird in the crow family, Corvidae
 Azure-naped jay (Cyanocorax heilprini), bird in the crow family, Corvidae
 Azure-rumped tanager (Tangara cabanisi), bird in the family Thraupidae
 Azure-shouldered tanager (Thraupis cyanoptera), bird in the family Thraupidae
 Azure-winged magpie (Cyanopica cyana), bird in the crow family, Corvidae

Plants
 Azure bluet (Houstonia caerulea), flower found in the eastern United States

In culture
Côte d'Azur ("Azure Coast") is a name commonly used for the French Riviera, part of France's southeastern coast on the Mediterranean.
 In Chinese mythology, the Azure Dragon is one of the Four Symbols of the Chinese constellations. It is sometimes called the Azure Dragon of the East. Known as Seiryū in Japan and Cheongryong in Korea, it represents the east and the spring season.
 Savoy azure (azzurro Savoia) is a traditional national color for Italy, taken from the traditional colors of the House of Savoy, the ruling house of the Kingdom of Piedmont-Sardinia that established the first modern united Italian state. The association between azure and Italian nationalism led in the Italy national football team donning azure jerseys, giving them the nickname, the Azzurri ("the Azures"). It is also color of the Italian state police (Polizia di Stato).
 Ken Nordine’s 1966 album “Colors” features the song ‘Azures’.

Astronomy
The true color of the exoplanet HD 189733b determined by astronomers is azure blue.

See also
 RAL 5009 Azure blue
 Shades of azure
 Lists of colors

References

Tertiary colors
Shades of blue
Bird colours